Villines Mill, also known as Boxley Mill or Whiteley Mill, was originally built c. 1840 by Abner Casey in the Buffalo River valley, in what is now Buffalo National River. After becoming known as Whiteley Mill, the mill was at the center of a Civil War skirmish known as the Battle of Whiteley's Mill. The mill was rebuilt in 1870 and replaced with a larger mill, becoming known as Villines Mill after the new owner. After three generations of Villines, the mill closed in the 1960s. The mill is included in the Big Buffalo Valley Historic District.

See also
National Register of Historic Places listings in Newton County, Arkansas

References

External links

Industrial buildings and structures on the National Register of Historic Places in Arkansas
National Register of Historic Places in Newton County, Arkansas
Historic district contributing properties in Arkansas
National Register of Historic Places in Buffalo National River
1870 establishments in Arkansas
Buildings and structures completed in 1870